The Glasgow Looking Glass was the first mass-produced publication to tell stories using illustrations, and as such is regarded as the earliest comics magazine.  The final issue was published on 3 April 1826.

Publishing history
The title was published by Glasgow lithographic printer John Watson and its principal strip illustrator was William Heath.  The fourth issue contained History of a Coat, its first comic strip. After the fifth issue, the title was changed to The Northern Looking Glass to reflect broader Scottish concerns.

Format
The fortnightly publication provided satirical snapshots of Glasgow society, British culture and Nineteenth century fashions. Innovations included use of the term "To be continued" and word balloons.

References

Comics magazines published in the United Kingdom
Magazines established in 1825
Magazines disestablished in 1826
1825 establishments in Scotland
1826 disestablishments in Scotland
Comics before 1900
Lithography
Communication design
Graphic design
Planographic printing
Printmaking
Defunct magazines published in the United Kingdom
Biweekly magazines published in the United Kingdom